The women's triple jump competition at the 2004 Summer Olympics in Athens was held at the Olympic Stadium on 21–23 August.

Coming into the competition, reigning world champion Tatyana Lebedeva was a favorite, having jumped 15.34m and 15.33m. earlier in July, slightly improving her position as the number two jumper in history which she had held since 2000.  World record holder Inessa Kravets from nine years earlier, was no longer a factor, but Yamilé Aldama was also jumping well with a 15.28 just three weeks before the Olympics.

In the qualifying round, Hrysopiyi Devetzi shocked everyone with her 15.32m automatic qualifier on her only attempt.  That was a Beamonesque improvement of her personal best and placed her as the number three jumper in history at that point in time, just 2 cm short of Lebedeva.  Only 14.45 was required as an automatic qualifier and 14 other women managed that, though none went over 14.90m.

In the first round of the final, Devetzi showed she was serious taking the early lead with 14.96m.  In the second round Trecia-Kaye Smith jumped 15.02m but was overshadowed by Françoise Mbango Etone's  African record, a 25 cm improvement over her own record best.  In the third round Devetzi improved to 15.14m to move back into second place.  In the fourth round Devetzi improved her position again to 15.25m with Aldama moving into third place with her best of the day 14.99m.  In the fifth round Lebedeva finally got over 15m with a 15.04m to take third place.  She solidified her position with a 15.14m in the final round but Etone also solidified her position with a second 15.30m.  After fouling her first attempt, Etone had five successive jumps over 15m including two at 15.30m.  It would be the first Olympic gold medal for Cameroon.  Etone would go on to defend her medal four year later with Cameroon's second Gold medal.  Her winning 15.39m jump in Beijing stood as the second best jump in history until 2019.

Of the top 16 jumps in history, most are between Etone, Devetzi, Lebedeva and Aldama, and mostly from jumps in 2004.  The only other athletes included in that group are two jumps by world record holder Kravets, two in 2019 by Yulimar Rojas and one each by Caterine Ibargüen and Yargeris Savigne (all three two time World Champions).

Competition format
The competition consisted of two rounds, qualification and final.  In qualification, each athlete jumped three times (stopping early if they made the qualifying distance).  At least the top twelve athletes moved on to the final; if more than twelve reached the qualifying distance, all who did so advanced.  Distances were reset for the final round.  Finalists jumped three times, after which the eight best jumped three more times (with the best distance of the six jumps counted).

Schedule
All times are Greece Standard Time (UTC+2)

Records
, the existing World and Olympic records were as follows.

No new records were set during the competition.

Results

Qualifying round
Rule: Qualifying standard 14.45 (Q) or at least 12 best qualified (q).

Final

References

External links
Official Olympic Report

W
Triple jump at the Olympics
2004 in women's athletics
Women's events at the 2004 Summer Olympics